Love Child is an Australian drama television series that follows the lives of staff and residents of the fictional Kings Cross Hospital and Stanton House in Sydney, starting in 1969 and continuing into the 1970s.

The program was created by Sarah Lambert and was first broadcast on the Nine Network on 17 February 2014. The program is based on the real-life forced adoption in Australia for which former Prime Minister Julia Gillard offered a national apology to those affected in 2013. Love Child was renewed for a second series on 2 March 2014. The series was renewed for a third series on 23 February 2015. The series was renewed for a fourth series on 8 November 2016 at Nine's upfronts.

In December 2017, Love Child was cancelled after four series.

Background 

On 8 April 2013, the Nine Network announced a new drama project from Playmaker Media named Love Child, an eight-part drama series by the creators of House Husbands. Joint heads of drama at Nine, Andy Ryan and Jo Rooney, stated "Love Child is a compelling and uplifting series that will appeal to every generation. The stories of young women and men fighting an unjust system are as relevant today as they were in the colourful and liberating world of Kings Cross in 1969." Love Child was created by Sarah Lambert. It is directed by Geoff Bennett, Grant Brown, Shawn Seet and Shirley Barrett, with Tim Pye, Sue Seeary and Sarah Lambert serving as producers. The series is also written by Lambert, Pye, Kym Goldsworthy, Cathryn Strickland, Giula Sandler, Matt Ford, Liz Doran and Vanessa Alexander.

Casting 
Jessica Marais, Jonathan LaPaglia and Mandy McElhinney were announced as the main castmembers in April 2013. Marais stars as Dr Joan Millar, a smart and sophisticated trainee obstetrician who returns home from London to take a job at the Kings Cross Hospital. LaPaglia stars as Dr Patrick McNaughton, the charismatic head of obstetrics at Kings Cross Hospital. McElhinney stars as Frances Bolton, the tough matron who runs Stanton House, a home for unwed pregnant young women. The remainder of the cast was announced on 11 February 2014, with Ryan Corr as Johnny Lowry, a 60s flower child; Ella Scott Lynch as Shirley Ryan, a Russian socialite; Sophie Hensser as Viv Maguire, a country girl; Harriet Dyer as Patricia Saunders, a ditzy blonde; Gracie Gilbert as Annie Carmichael, a strong-willed mother determined to get back her baby; and Miranda Tapsell in her Logie award winning debut role as Martha Tennant, an Aboriginal girl who was also adopted.

Corr did not return as a main cast member in season two but made a guest appearance. Matthew Le Nevez, Lincoln Younes and Marshall Napier joined the cast for season two as Jim, Chris Vesty, and Gregory respectively. Leah Purcell played a key character in the second half of season two. Jonathan Lapaglia did not return for the fourth season. Dan Hamill joined the cast along with Matt Day, Danielle Catanzariti, Darcie Irwin-Simpson, Sophia Forrest and Ronan Keating.

Cast and characters

Main

Notes

Recurring
 Maya Stange as Eva McNaughton (series 1–3)
 Ben Lawson as Colin Ryan (series 1)
 Ben O'Toole as Pete (series 1–3)
 Lincoln Younes as Chris Vesty (series 2–3)
 Jessica June as Tania (series 2)
 Andrew Ryan as Simon Bowditch (series 2–4)
 Marshall Napier as Greg Matheson (series 2)
 Ian Bolt as Bob Flannery (series 1–2)

Guest
 Lucy Wigmore as Carol (series 1)
 Aileen Beale as Mark Foy's saleswoman (series 1)
 Charlotte Hazzard as Helen (series 3)
 Anna Lawrence as Maggie Flanagan (series 3)
 Jessica Donoghue as Faye (series 2–3)

Episodes

Ratings

Awards and nominations

References

External links
 
 

2010s Australian drama television series
2014 Australian television series debuts
2017 Australian television series endings
English-language television shows
Kings Cross, New South Wales
Nine Network original programming
Pregnancy-themed television shows
Television series based on actual events
Television series by Playmaker Media
Television series set in 1969
Television series set in the 1970s
Television shows set in Sydney